Farwell is a city in and the county seat of Parmer County, Texas, United States.  Its population was 1,363 at the 2010 census. The city is located on the Texas-New Mexico border with the city of Texico, New Mexico, across the border.

History

Farwell began as a cow camp for the XIT Ranch, a huge ranch that was established in 1880. Farwell was named for brothers Charles B. and John V. Farwell of Lake Forest, Illinois, who built the Texas State Capitol building in exchange for 3,050,000 acres of ranchland. That region of Texas had been controlled by the Comanche from about 1725, when they defeated the Apache and forced them to migrate to the Rockies in New Mexico and to other regions. The Red River War of 1874–1875—the biggest military operation the U.S. had between the Civil War and World War One—had five armies converge on that part of the High Plains, ultimately defeating the main Comanche force in Palo Duro Canyon (80 mi northeast of Farwell) by driving off and slaughtering the Comanches' horses.

The Farwell brothers established the XIT on their new land, ultimately employing 800 cowboys, stringing over 6,000 miles of barbed wire, and hiring former Texas Rangers to defeat the hundreds of cattle rustlers operating across the state line in the New Mexico territory. Many researchers hold that the XIT ultimately failed because of that massive rustling operation, ultimately persuading stockholders to begin selling off the ranch to families who came to that part of the High Plains drawn by the cheap price of land. When the cow-camp that would become Farwell was established is not documented, but when Parmer County was created in 1907 (previously part of Deaf Smith County to its north), the election was held for county seat in a contest between Farwell, Bovina, Parmerton, and Friona, all to Farwell's northeast, all which had started as cow camps, but had varying success thus far in attracting settlers who ran saloons, stores, stables, and other services for the cowboys. Parmerton was initially voted county seat that year, and a one-story courthouse was built there.

The election was hotly contested by politicians in the other towns, so a new vote was scheduled. Cowboys, who were the largest demographic, lived in their saddles and sleeping bags most of the time, with no fixed address. A new regulation was established that each man would vote in the place where he did his laundry. Farwell, possessing the only laundry at that time, thus received all the cowboy votes,  though Friona was, and remains, about four times the size of Farwell,  so Farwell became county seat in the 1908 vote. The Farwell courthouse was erected quickly thereafter. When the decision was made to begin selling off the XIT to settlers, they would arrive in Farwell on the railroad, which had reached there in 1899, linking rail to the east with rail to the west of the Rockies Mountains via the track laid between Farwell (and her sister city on the other side of the state line, Texico, New Mexico, also about 1,300 people today) to Belen, New Mexico. Farwell lies at the junction of two branches of the Santa Fe Railway; one branch goes northeast toward Amarillo and the other southeast toward Lubbock. Families from across America arrived by train, stayed in the four-story Farwell Hotel, and toured the available homestead sites by touring cars.

Many of the families then arrived in Farwell and the rest of the region in covered wagons and established their homes in dugouts in the prairie soil (no stone or trees indigenous to the area were available for construction). Dry-land farming and herding were always risky, but families persevered year by year, often relying entirely on their small windmill pumping enough water for the home, a milk cow, some chickens, a few fruit trees, and vegetable gardens when crops and cattle withered during droughts and wind storms.

When the premier historian of U.S. western history, Walter Prescott Webb, wrote that the American character sprang from the unforgiving conditions of the High Plains, he could have had Farwell and its surrounding ranchers and farmers in mind.

For years, a dispute has been simmering over of which state Farwell is lawfully a part: Texas or New Mexico.  The straight north–south border between the two states was originally defined as the 103rd meridian, but the 1859 survey that was supposed to mark that boundary mistakenly set the border between 2.29 and 3.77 miles too far west of that line, making the current towns of Farwell, Texline and a part of Glenrio appear to be within Texas.  New Mexico's short border with Oklahoma, in contrast, was surveyed on the correct meridian.  New Mexico's draft constitution in 1910 stated that the border is on the 103rd meridian as intended.  The disputed strip, hundreds of miles long, includes parts of valuable oilfields of the Permian Basin.  A bill was passed in the New Mexico Senate to fund and file a lawsuit in the U.S. Supreme Court to recover the strip from Texas, but the bill did not become law.  Today, land in the strip is included in Texas land surveys and the land and towns for all purposes are taxed and governed by the State of Texas.

Geography

Farwell lies on the level plains of the Llano Estacado at  (34.382919, –103.038339).

Demographics

2020 census

As of the 2020 United States census, there were 1,425 people, 541 households, and 358 families residing in the city.

2000 census
As of the census of 2000, 1,364 people, 499 households, and 346 families were residing in the city. The population density was 1,666.8 people/sq mi (642.2/km). The 560 housing units  averaged 684.3/sq mi (263.7/km). The racial makeup of the city was 75.00% White, 0.44% African American, 0.51% Native American, 1.03% Asian, 20.82% from other races, and 2.20% from two or more races. Hispanics or Latinos of any race were 31.96% of the population.

Of the 499 households, 34.9% had children under the age of 18 living with them, 56.9% were married couples living together, 9.6% had a female householder with no husband present, and 30.5% were not families. About 28.1% of all households were made up of individuals, and 17.2% had someone living alone who was 65 years of age or older. The average household size was 2.58, and the average family size was 3.18.

In the city, the age distribution was 27.9% under 18, 6.8% from 18 to 24, 24.8% from 25 to 44, 20.6% from 45 to 64, and 19.9% who were 65 or older. The median age was 39 years. For every 100 females, there were 88.7 males. For every 100 females age 18 and over, there were 80.9 males.

The median income for a household in the city was $29,808, and for a family was $34,676. Males had a median income of $27,448 versus $21,181 for females. The per capita income for the city was $15,875. About 13.9% of families and 16.7% of the population were below the poverty line, including 22.8% of those under age 18 and 13.7% of those age 65 or over.

Education
The City of Farwell is served by the Farwell Independent School District.

Notable people
 Charlie Phillips, singer, songwriter

Gallery

References

External links

 Parmer County
 Farwell school district
 Farwell in the Handbook of Texas

Cities in Texas
Cities in Parmer County, Texas
County seats in Texas